The 2009 Rutgers Scarlet Knights football team represented Rutgers University in the 2009 NCAA Division I FBS football season. Their head coach was Greg Schiano and they played their home games at Rutgers Stadium in Piscataway, New Jersey. The Scarlet Knights finished the season 9–4, 3–4 in Big East play and won the St. Petersburg Bowl, 45–24, over UCF.

Schedule

NOTE: All Big East Network games were produced by ESPN+ and shown locally on SNY.

References

Rutgers
Rutgers Scarlet Knights football seasons
Gasparilla Bowl champion seasons
Rutgers Scarlet Knights football